John Cocke may refer to:

John Cocke (computer scientist) (1925–2002), American computer scientist
John Alexander Cocke (1772–1854), American politician and Tennessee state militia officer during the Creek War
John Cocke (colonel), American officer in the Tennessee militia at the Battle of New Orleans
John Hartwell Cocke (1780–1866), American planter and brigadier general in the War of 1812
John R. Cocke (1788–1854), American politician in Virginia
John Cocke (Mississippi), state legislator during Reconstruction

See also
Cocke
John Cox (disambiguation)
John Cock (disambiguation)